Ableman is a surname. Notable people with the surname include:

Michael Ableman, American writer
Paul Ableman (1927–2006), English playwright and writer

Places

 Ableman, Wisconsin, the former name of Rock Springs, Wisconsin

See also
Ableman v. Booth, United States Supreme Court case